Seeds of Time is a studio album by English bassist Dave Holland's Quintet recorded in 1984 and released on the ECM label. alto saxophonist Steve Coleman, trumpeter Kenny Wheeler and trombonist Julian Priester return from Holland’s previous album, along with new drummer Marvin “Smitty” Smith.

Reception
The Allmusic review by Scott Yanow awarded the album 4 stars, stating, "The all-star musicians pack plenty of music and concise solos into each performance (nine originals), and the unique group carved out its own niche, not quite free but certainly unpredictable".

Tyran Grillo of Between Sound and Space wrote "Seeds of Time presents the Dave Holland Quintet in arguably its finest incarnation... The energy of this music is such that we find ourselves lost in every contortion of its features. Holland is no holds barred without being aggressive, direct without being confrontational, straightforward without ever being staid. Each successive album only seems to further energize his band mates, and with Seeds of Time we know firsthand how he can do the same for his listeners. A must-hear for those who take their coffee with excitement."

Track listing
All compositions by Dave Holland except as indicated
 "Uhren" (Steve Coleman) – 4:53   
 "Homecoming" – 6:01   
 "Perspicuity" (Doug Hammond) – 3:42   
 "Celebration" (Julian Priester) – 5:11   
 "World Protection Blues" (Hammond) – 7:00   
 "Gridlock (Opus 8)" (Coleman) – 8:24   
 "Walk-a-way" (Dave Holland, Marvin Smith) – 3:55   
 "The Good Doctor" (Kenny Wheeler) – 5:54   
 "Double Vision" – 7:08  
Recorded at Tonstudio Bauer in Ludwigsburg, West Germany in November 1984

Personnel
David Holland – bass
Steve Coleman – alto saxophone, soprano saxophone, flute
Kenny Wheeler – trumpet, pocket trumpet, cornet, fluegelhorn
Julian Priester – trombone
Marvin "Smitty" Smith – drums, percussion

References

External links

ECM Records albums
Dave Holland albums
1985 albums
Albums produced by Manfred Eicher